The Mining Enforcement and Safety Administration (MESA) under the U.S. Department of the Interior was the predecessor of the Mine Safety and Health Administration, prior to March 9, 1978.

History
Through an administrative action in 1973, the United States Secretary of the Interior created the MESA as an agency within the Department of the Interior. Because of concern about the apparent conflict of interest between the health and safety enforcement functions of the United States Bureau of Mines (BOM) and its production-focused oversight of mineral resources, BOM's safety operations and health enforcement responsibilities were split off to MESA's charge until MSHA's establishment in 1978.

See also
 Federal Mine Safety and Health Review Commission
 Mine Safety and Health Act of 1977
 Mine Safety and Health Administration (MSHA)

References

United States Department of the Interior agencies
Defunct agencies of the United States government
Mine safety
Mining law and governance
Government agencies established in 1973
1978 disestablishments in the United States
1973 establishments in the United States
Government agencies disestablished in 1978